Pristimantis petrobardus is a species of frog in the family Strabomantidae.
It is endemic to Peru.
Its natural habitats are tropical moist montane forests and tropical high-altitude shrubland.

References

petrobardus
Endemic fauna of Peru
Amphibians of Peru
Amphibians of the Andes
Amphibians described in 1991
Taxonomy articles created by Polbot